Jablanka is a village in Serbia. It is situated in the Vršac municipality, in the South Banat District, Vojvodina province. The village has a Romanian ethnic majority (67.97%) and its population numbering 247 people (2011 census).

References

Populated places in Serbian Banat
Populated places in South Banat District
Vršac
Romanian communities in Serbia